In the physical sciences, a multilayer or stratified medium is a stack of different thin films. Typically, a multilayer is man made for a specific purpose. Since layers are thin with respect to some relevant length scale, interface effects are much more important than in bulk materials, giving rise to novel physical properties.

The term "multilayer" is not an extension of "monolayer" and "bilayer", which describe a single layer that is one or two molecules thick. A multilayer medium rather consists of several thin films.

Examples
An optical coating, as used for instance in a dielectric mirror, is made of several layers that have different refractive indexes.

Giant magnetoresistance is a macroscopic quantum effect observed in alternating ferromagnetic and non-magnetic conductive layers.

See also
 Transfer-matrix method (optics)
 Dielectric mirror

References
 

Thin films